D'Gary (Ernest Randrianasolo; born 22 July 1961) is a Malagasy musician of Bara ethnicity. His primary instrument is the acoustic guitar.

Musical style
D'Gary's elaborate playing style is characterised by his use of alternative tunings. His style developed from his interest in Malagasy music such as tsapiky popular in southern Madagascar and has been compared to the music produced on traditional instruments like the Vezo's marovany frame box zither and the Bara's lokanga violin.

In 2007, he toured through North America with the International Guitar Night ensemble and recorded the International Guitar Night II live album with the collaboration of Brian Gore (US), Miguel de la Bastide (Trinidad) and Clive Carroll (UK) under the Pacific Music label.

In April 2009, he toured the United States as part of the Throw Down Your Heart tour with Bela Fleck and other African musicians.

Selected discography

Studio albums
 Malagasy Guitar – D'Gary. Music From Madagascar – 10 February 1993 (Shanachie)
 The Long Way Home (with Dama) – 15 September 1994 (Shanachie)
 Horombe (with Jihe) – 21 May 1996 (Stern's)
 Mbo Loza – 24 June 1997 (Indigo)
 Akata Meso – 9 July 2002 (Indigo)

References

External links
 RFI Musique biography
 GITARA GASY! by Ian Anderson features background information and interview.

1961 births
Living people
People from Antananarivo
20th-century Malagasy male singers
Malagasy guitarists
Label Bleu artists
21st-century Malagasy male singers